John Ashton Papillon (1838–1891) was a British photographer and Royal Engineer who was commissioned to accompany and photographically document the Anglo-French military expedition to northern China during the Second Opium War in 1860. Papillon produced images taken from between Canton and the Taku Forts but became ill and was evacuated on 29 September 1860 before completing his mission.

References
 Bennett, Terry. History of Photography in China, 1842-1860 (London: Bernard Quaritch Ltd., 2009).  (hbk),  (hbk)
 Thiriez, Régine. Barbarian Lens: Western Photographers of the Qianlong Emperor's European Palaces (Amsterdam: Gordon and Breach, 1998), 6. 

19th-century British photographers
British people of the Second Opium War
War photographers
Photography in China
1838 births
1891 deaths